Imboden is a city in Lawrence County, Arkansas, United States. The population was 677 at the 2010 census. It is named after a family of settlers.

History 
The community was first settled around 1828 and was incorporated in 1887.

In 1912, Imboden elected Joe Sullivan as the youngest elected mayor in the United States of that period. He was 21 years old and paralyzed, so relied on a goat-driven cart. He left the town in 1914 to pursue further education.

Imboden has two public schools. Sloan-Hendrix School was established in 1899 as Sloan-Hendrix Academy, a private school affiliated with Hendrix College in Conway. It later became  a public  school. Imboden Area Charter School, an open-enrollment public charter school, opened in 2002.

Geography
Imboden is located in northwestern Lawrence County at  (36.201766, -91.179899). It is on the south side of the Spring River, a southeast-flowing tributary of the Black River. In October 2008 a modern boat launch was opened with a  parking area. To the north of Imboden, across the Spring River, is Randolph County.

List of highways
 US 62/US 63/US 412 run through the center of Imboden. Highway 62 splits off to the northeast in the center of Imboden, crossing the Spring River and leading northeast  to Pocahontas. Highways 63 and 412 leave to the southeast on East 3rd Street, leading  to Black Rock.
 Arkansas Highway 115 leads southwest from Imboden  to Smithville.

Demographics

2020 census

As of the 2020 United States census, there were 640 people, 294 households, and 203 families residing in the town.

2000 census
As of the census of 2000, there were 684 people, 308 households, and 194 families residing in the town. The racial makeup of the town was 98.25% Whites, 0.73% Native Americans, and 1.02% from two or more races.  0.29% of the population were Hispanics or Latinos of any race.

There were 308 households, out of which 24.4% had children under the age of 18 living with them, 54.9% were married couples living together, 6.2% had a female householder with no husband present, and 37.0% were non-families. 35.7% of all households were made up of individuals, and 23.4% had someone living alone who was 65 years of age or older.  The average household size was 2.22 and the average family size was 2.85.

In the town, the population was spread out, with 23.0% under the age of 18, 6.9% from 18 to 24, 22.7% from 25 to 44, 22.1% from 45 to 64, and 25.4% who were 65 years of age or older.  The median age was 43 years. For every 100 females, there were 82.4 males.  For every 100 females age 18 and over, there were 82.4 males.

The median income for a household in the town was $24,489, and the median income for a family was $33,438. Males had a median income of $28,977 versus $16,667 for females. The per capita income for the town was $14,361.  About 11.1% of families and 17.8% of the population were below the poverty line, including 28.4% of those under age 18 and 9.8% of those age 65 or over.

Education 
Public education is provided by:
 Sloan–Hendrix School District, which leads to graduation from Sloan–Hendrix High School.
 Imboden Area Charter School, an open-enrollment school for kindergarten through eighth grade.

The Imboden Disaster Facility is currently being constructed in town. This facility is part of the Regional Center for Disaster Preparedness Education - Arkansas State University.

Government

City officials 

 Mayor - Chris Jones
 Treasurer/Recorder - Belinda Chappell
 Council Members
 Creston Hutton
 Dan Matthews
 Preston Clark
 Joe Chappell
 Rebecca Jones

Emergency services 
Police

 Lawrence County Sheriff's Department
 Arkansas State Police (Troop B)

Fire/Rescue

 Imboden Volunteer Fire Department
 Lawrence County Dive Team
Volunteer First Responders

Ambulance

 Promed Ambulance
 Survival Flight 9

Transport

 Dail's Body Shop & Wrecker Services

Attractions and recreation 
 Lawrence County Fair and Rodeo - located on the Sloan-Hendrix Campus
 Annual Lawrence County Fair Auto Show - located in Imboden City Park
 Annual 4 July fireworks show - located near Sloan-Hendrix Campus
 Annual Freedom in the Park Celebration sponsored by S&H Quick Shop  - located in Imboden City Park
 Annual Christmas Parade

References

External links
Official website
History of Imboden
Sloan-Hendrix Public Schools

Cities in Lawrence County, Arkansas
Cities in Arkansas
Populated places established in 1828